The 1926 Haskell Indians football team was an American football that represented the Haskell Institute (now known as Haskell Indian Nations University) as an independent during the 1926 college football season. With players from 18 different tribes, the team compiled a 12–0–1 record and outscored opponents by a total of 558 to 64.  The team's 558 points was the most scored by any college football team in many years.

Despite missing two games, fullback Mayes McLain, an Irish-Cherokee youth, set all-time single-season records that have never been broken. These records include 38 rushing touchdowns, 253 points scored (38 touchdowns, 19 extra points, and two field goals), and a scoring average of 23 points per game. He also set a single-game scoring record with 55 points (eight touchdowns and seven extra points) against .

Other key players included tackle and team captain Tom Stidham, tackle Theodore "Tiny" Roebuck, center Albert Hawley, quarterback Egbert Ward, and halfbacks George Levi and Elijah Smith.

Prior to the 1926 season, Haskell built its own football stadium, Haskell Memorial Stadium, at a cost of approximately $200,000. On October 30, the stadium was formally dedicated with a 36–0 victory over Bucknell.

On December 15, prior to the Rose Bowl, Haskell had a scrimmage with Stanford's second team and won, scoring four touchdowns to Stanford's three.

Schedule

References

Haskell
Haskell Indian Nations Fighting Indians football seasons
College football undefeated seasons
Haskell Indians football